Panomkorn Pladchurnil (born 16 June 1962) is a Thai former professional tennis player.

A regular member of Thailand's Davis Cup team of the 1980s, Pladchurnil featured in a total of 14 ties, for seven singles and nine doubles wins. He was the men's singles champion at the 1981 Southeast Asian Games.

Pladchurnil and swimmer Ratchaneewan Bulakul were chosen to light the flame in the opening ceremony of the 1978 Asian Games in Bangkok, as representatives of Thailand's young sportspeople.

References

External links
 
 
 

1962 births
Living people
Panomkorn Pladchurnil
Southeast Asian Games medalists in tennis
Panomkorn Pladchurnil
Panomkorn Pladchurnil
Panomkorn Pladchurnil
Competitors at the 1981 Southeast Asian Games
Competitors at the 1983 Southeast Asian Games
Competitors at the 1985 Southeast Asian Games
Competitors at the 1987 Southeast Asian Games
Competitors at the 1989 Southeast Asian Games
Competitors at the 1979 Southeast Asian Games
Panomkorn Pladchurnil